Asterostomatidae is an extinct family of sea urchins belonging to the order Spatangoida.

They are slow-moving, shallow infaunal, or sediment-dwelling organisms, and are deposit feeders or detritivores. They lived during the Eocene and Miocene in what is now of Cuba, Cyprus and United States, from 55.8 to 5.332 Ma

Genera
 Antillaster
 Asterostoma
 Brissolampas
 Brissomorpha
 Cleistechinus
 Heterobrissus
 Megapetalus
 Moronaster
 Platybrissus
 Prosostoma
 Pygospatangus

References

Spatangoida
Eocene first appearances
Messinian extinctions